Paulo Iago Álvarez Morón (born 10 April 2007), known as Paulo Iago or just Paulo, is a Spanish professional footballer currently playing as a midfielder for Real Madrid.

Club career

Early life
Born in Madrid, Paulo Iago developed an interest for football at the age of two, and was encouraged by his father, Xosé "Pepe" Álvarez Murias, a former amateur footballer from A Fonsagrada, Lugo.

He joined Parque Sureste at the age of four, but broke his tibia and fibula in a skateboarding accident shortly after his first training session.  After a year out, he returned to become top scorer in his category at the age of five. He was scouted by professional sides Atlético Madrid, Rayo Vallecano and Real Madrid, a rare feat for a player of such a young age. Short spells with Adpi Rivas and Estrella de Madrid followed, before he joined Real Madrid in 2014.

He progressed well through La Fábrica, scoring over 150 goals in his first five years with the club. After signing with super-agent Jorge Mendes, he signed his first contract with Los Blancos in 2022.

International career
Paulo Iago has represented Spain at under-15 level. He was called up to the under-16 team in August 2022.

Style of play
A prolific goal-scorer from midfield, technically gifted and skilful, he has drawn comparisons to Ballon d'Or winners Lionel Messi and Luka Modrić.

References

2007 births
Living people
Footballers from Madrid
Spanish footballers
Spain youth international footballers
Association football midfielders
Real Madrid CF players